is a Japanese composer associated with the postminimalist movement of contemporary classical music.

Biography
He received a Ph.D. in music from the University of California, San Diego in 1988. His composition instructors have included Joji Yuasa, Morton Feldman, Gordon Mumma, and Julio Estrada.

He currently serves as a professor at Kyushu University (Faculty of Design) in Fukuoka, Fukuoka, Kyūshū, Japan.

His music has been recorded for the Tzadik Records and Pinna labels.

Major works
Falling Scale No. 1 - No. 7 (1975–82)
No. 1, 2 and 3 (piano solo)
No. 4 and 7 (2 pianos)
No. 5 (3 pianos)
No. 6 (prepared piano or piano)
Upward Falling for piano (1980)
Planetary Folklore I for piano (1980)
Begin at the Beginning, End at the End, Begin at the End, End at the Beginning for piano (1982) 
Decorational Offering for piano (1983) 
Night Chant No. 2 for mixed chorus (1994)
Patterns of Plants (1995-)
Antiphones Resounded for mezzo-soprano, tenor, children's chorus and instrumental ensemble (1999)

External links
Mamoru Fujieda biography from Other Minds site
Mamoru Fujieda page
Faculty page at the Kyushu University Website

1955 births
20th-century classical composers
20th-century Japanese male musicians
21st-century classical composers
21st-century Japanese musicians
21st-century Japanese male musicians
Japanese classical composers
Japanese male classical composers
Academic staff of Kyushu University
Living people
Place of birth missing (living people)
Tzadik Records artists